This is a list of premiers of Saskatchewan in order of time served in office as premier of Saskatchewan as of . The premier always stays in office during an election campaign. That time is included in the total, even if the premier and their Party are defeated in the election. Time is counted until the transition to the new government.

Notes 

Saskatchewan